Birds described in 1869 include Hartlaub's spurfowl, subantarctic shearwater, Himalayan vulture, Palani laughingthrush, Anchieta's barbet and the long-tailed myna.

Events
John Gerrard Keulemans was persuaded by Richard Bowdler Sharpe to illustrate his A Monograph of the Alcedinidae, or Family of Kingfishers (1868-1871)

Publications
Tommaso Salvadori Monografia del Gener Ceyx Lacépède. Torino (1869) (Atti della Accademia delle Scienze di Torino)
 Jean-Joseph Zéphirin Gerbe Les Oiseaux décrits et figurés d'après la classification de Georges Cuvier, mise au courant des progrès de la science, (1869).
Otto Finsch and Gustav Hartlaub On a small Collection of Birds from the Tonga Islands Proceedings of the Zoological Society of London  1869 online
Osbert Salvin and Philip Sclater On Peruvian birds collected by Mr Whitely Proceedings of the Zoological Society of London. 1869 592-596 online

Ongoing events
Theodor von Heuglin Ornithologie von Nordost-Afrika (Ornithology of Northeast Africa) (Cassel, 1869–1875)
John Gould The Birds of Australia Supplement 1851–69. 1 vol. 81 plates; Artists: J. Gould and H. C. Richter; Lithographer: H. C. Richter
John Gould The Birds of Asia 1850-83 7 vols. 530 plates, Artists: J. Gould, H. C. Richter, W. Hart and J. Wolf; Lithographers:H. C. Richter and W. Hart
The Ibis

References

Bird
Birding and ornithology by year